Josuani Airport  is an airstrip in the pampa of the Beni Department in Bolivia. The runway is within the Reserva Nacional Lagunas de Beni y Pando, a Bolivian wildlife sanctuary.

See also

Transport in Bolivia
List of airports in Bolivia

References

External links 
OpenStreetMap - Josuani
OurAirports - Josuani
Bing Maps - Josuani

Airports in Beni Department